Field Hockey was among the sports at the 6th All Africa Games held in September 1995 in Harare, Zimbabwe. The play featured both a men's and women's tournament. The winners of each tournament qualified for the 2000 Summer Olympics.

Medal summary

Medal table

Results

Final standings

References

1991 All-Africa Games
All-Africa Games
Field hockey at the African Games
All-Africa Games
1991
1991 All-Africa Games